Rufford Old Hall is a National Trust property in Rufford, Lancashire, England. Built in about 1530 for Sir Robert Hesketh, only the Great Hall survives from the original structure. A brick-built wing in the Jacobean style was added in 1661, at right angles to the Great Hall, and a third wing was added in the 1820s.

History
Until 1936, Rufford Old Hall was in the continuous ownership of the Hesketh family who were lords of the manor of Rufford from the 15th century. The Heskeths moved to Rufford New Hall in 1798. In 1846 Sir Thomas George Hesketh, 5th Baronet married Lady Anna Maria Arabella Fermor, sister and heiress of George Richard William Fermor, 5th and last Earl of Pomfret. In 1936 Rufford Old Hall, with its collection of arms and armour and 17th-century oak furniture, was donated to the National Trust by Thomas Fermor-Hesketh, 1st Baron Hesketh.

Shakespeare connection
There is some evidence to suggest that Shakespeare may have performed in the Great Hall. In about 1580 Shakespeare had been sent, by his Stratford schoolmaster, to be an assistant teacher in the household of Alexander Hoghton at Lea Hall near Preston, and the "wilim Shakeshaft nowe dwellynge with me", referred to by Hoghton in his will, is almost certainly Shakespeare. In his will Hoghton, who died in 1581, had bequeathed to Sir Thomas Hesketh his musical instruments and "playe clothes". By about 1585 Shakespeare had joined a company of players kept by Lord Strange, son of Lord Derby, probably having been recommended by Sir Thomas. In her 1974 book, Lancashire Legends, Kathleen Eyre claims that although "it may be no more than a fond hope" there is evidence that a "William Shakeshaft" (a common version of Shakespeare's name) was a youthful member of the "Hesketh Company of Players" who visited in about 1585. The date coincides with Shakespeare's absence from Stratford-on-Avon following a bout of deer-stealing from neighbouring parks, particularly that of Sir Thomas Lucy of Charlecote.

Architecture

The timber-framed hall house with great hall, in a late medieval pattern which continued in use in Tudor times, was built for Sir Robert Hesketh in about 1530. The hall has a flagged floor. It has a stone chimney, five bays, and a hammerbeam roof. The five hammerbeams each terminate, at both ends, in a carved wooden angel. The hall is overlooked by a quatrefoil squint in an arched doorway in the second-floor drawing room.

In 1661 a Jacobean style rustic brick wing was built at right angles to the great hall which contrasts with the medieval black and white timbering. This wing was built from small two-inch bricks similar to Bank Hall, and Carr House and St Michael's Church in Much Hoole. The west wing, which housed the family apartments was possibly destroyed in a fire.

In the 1820s a third wing was constructed, formed out of the medieval domestic offices, and a castellated tower was built to join the Great Hall to the Charles II wing. In 1949 a secret chamber, used as a priest hole in the 16th century, was discovered above the Great Hall.

Fixtures and fittings

A free-standing, carved wooden screen made of bog oak in the Great Hall probably dates from between 1530 and 1540. It is described by Pevsner as being "of an exuberance of decoration matched nowhere else in England" and is the only known surviving example from the first half of the 16th century. It stands at the north end of the great hall, covering the entrance to the original kitchens. It has three spiral finials, two outer ones carved from single lengths of timber at the sides of the screen framing eight traceried panels. On the top-rail are two angels, a male and female bearing shields with the arms of Fitton and Banastre families. Two horizontal rails are morticed into the uprights. Three errors were possibly incorporated by its makers to avoid a charge of heresy, as a contemporary belief was that God alone could create perfection. One panel on the hall side is upside down, on the opposite side one panel has a different pattern and an angel has an extra finger.

On the staircase is a painting by Godfrey Kneller of Thomas Hesketh, who was Second MP for Preston in 1722 and who rebuilt the east wing in the 1720s, with his wife Martha and son in 1723. The sitting room displays a copy of the 1577 map of Lancashire by Christopher Saxton.

Gardens

There are gardens and pasture to the rear and side of the hall and woodland at the front. The Rufford Branch of the Leeds and Liverpool Canal, completed in 1781, passes very close to the site on the east side. A feature of the gardens is a pair of topiary squirrels.

Ghosts
The hall is reputedly haunted by a grey lady, Queen Elizabeth I and a man in Elizabethan clothing. The figure of a man floating above the canal at the rear of the building has also been reported.

See also

Grade I listed buildings in Lancashire
Listed buildings in Rufford, Lancashire

References

External links

List of paintings on view
Shakespeare at Rufford BBC
Rufford Old Hall information at the National Trust
RUFFORD and the HESKETHS at heskethbank.com
"Rufford Old Hall" at nationaltrustimages.org.uk

Grade I listed buildings in Lancashire
Country houses in Lancashire
National Trust properties in Lancashire
Historic house museums in Lancashire
Gardens in Lancashire
Reportedly haunted locations in North West England
Timber framed buildings in England
Buildings and structures in the Borough of West Lancashire
1530 establishments in England
Rufford, Lancashire
Hall houses